Protonemacheilus longipectoralis is a species of hillstream loach that is endemic to China.  It is the only species in its genus.

References

Nemacheilidae
Monotypic fish genera
Fish of Asia
Freshwater fish of China
Fish described in 1990